Caroline Brazier is an Australian actress who is best known for the role of Chrissy Merchant in Packed to the Rafters and the starring roles of Veronica Johnson and her twin sister Betti in the children's television series Parallax. Brazier has also had a number of roles in the theatre, films and other television series.

Personal life 
Brazier was married to fellow Australian actor Geoff Morrell.

Originally from Perth, Western Australia, Brazier graduated from the National Institute of Dramatic Art (NIDA) in 1998. In between acting engagements, Brazier often heads home to spend time with her parents in Perth.

Career
Brazier has appeared in The Merchant of Venice, Julius Caesar and Antony and Cleopatra for the Bell Shakespeare Company, Whale Music at Darlinghurst Theatre, and Speed-the-Plow for Perth Theatre Company. In 2012 she won Best Actress in a Leading Role in an Independent Production for I Want To Sleep With Tom Stoppard (Sydney Theatre Awards).

She also played the Superintendent in Accidental Death of an Anarchist (2018) at Sydney Theatre and appeared in the music video for Silverchair's 1999 song "Emotion Sickness".

Filmography

Film

Television

References

External links

Living people
Australian film actresses
Australian stage actresses
Australian television actresses
Actresses from Perth, Western Australia
National Institute of Dramatic Art alumni
Year of birth missing (living people)
21st-century Australian actresses